Time lady may refer to:

Time Lady, a way to refer to female members of the Time Lord species on the science fiction television programme Doctor Who
The Time Lady, a character in the Diana Wynne Jones novel A Tale of Time City
Time lady, a female voice heard on a speaking clock that people could dial to find out the current time, down to the second, before the Internet and other options for finding out the time existed.
UK:
Jane Cain
Pat Simmons (voice actor)
Sara Mendes da Costa
U.S.:
Jane Barbe
Joanne Daniels
Pat Fleet
Mary Moore (voice actor)